United Nations Security Council Resolution 320, adopted on 29 September 1972, after reaffirming previous resolutions, the Council expressed concern that despite the previous resolutions, several states were covertly and overtly violating the sanctions on Southern Rhodesia. The Council requested that the committee which had been established in resolution 253, consider the type of action which should be taken "in view of the open and persistent refusal of South Africa and Portugal to implement sanctions" and asked for the report no later than 31 January 1973.

The resolution was adopted with 13 votes to none; the United Kingdom and United States abstained.

See also
 List of United Nations Security Council Resolutions 301 to 400 (1971–1976)
 Unilateral Declaration of Independence (Rhodesia)

References
Text of the Resolution at undocs.org

External links
 

 0320
 0320
 0320
 0320
United Nations Security Council sanctions regimes
September 1972 events